"Nobody's Business" is a Donald Duck comic written and drawn by Don Rosa, featuring Donald and Gladstone Gander. The story was first published in Uncle Scrooge #220 in August 1987. "Nobody's Business" was Don Rosa's second comic story, after The Son of the Sun.

Plot
Uncle Scrooge catches sight of his two loafer nephews, Donald Duck and Gladstone Gander, from his Money Bin. Although he feels his fortune is secure in the hands of his chosen heirs, Huey, Dewey, and Louie, he feels he should do something for his other nephews, and decides to put them through a test to see what kind of business they would be good at. He calls Donald and Gladstone to his room, passes five thousand dollars to both, and tells them to return in twenty-four hours to report how they've invested it.

Donald tries his wings in the restaurant and industry businesses and with inventions, but his enthusiasm exceeds his common sense, and he quickly squanders his money in failed enterprises. At the same time, Gladstone lies around in a hammock reading comic books while amazing opportunities get dropped into his lap.

The next day, Scrooge is initially pleased at how well Gladstone has done (to Donald's chagrin), but then a clerk pulls Scrooge aside and tells him that all of Gladstone's opportunities have resulted in losses to McDuck Enterprises. Scrooge is chilled, thinking that Gladstone's legendary luck is the one thing that could ruin him forever.

Both nephews receive their own company, though Scrooge has little hope for their success: Donald gets a soda stand, and Gladstone becomes an owner of a comic book publisher.

External links

Disney comics stories
Donald Duck comics by Don Rosa
1987 in comics